Eupanacra waloensis is a moth of the family Sphingidae. It is known from Yunnan in China.

The length of the forewings is 20–23 mm. It is similar to Eupanacra malayana. There are no gold bands on the upperside of the abdomen.

References

Eupanacra
Moths described in 2000